This is a list of drainage basins in the U.S. State of Colorado.

The U.S. State of Colorado includes the headwaters of several important rivers.  The state is divided into two major hydrographic regions by the Continental Divide of the Americas.  East of the Continental Divide, surface waters flow to the Gulf of Mexico, either via the Rio Grande or via one of several rivers (the South Platte River, the North Platte River, the Republican River, the Arkansas River, the Cimarron River, or the Canadian River) which eventually feed the Mississippi River along the way.  West of the Continental Divide, surface waters flow via the Green River, the upper Colorado River (formerly the Grand River), or the San Juan River into the Colorado River and on to the Gulf of California.  Colorado also has three significant endorheic basins: the San Luis Closed Basin in the San Luis Valley, and the Bear Creek Basin and the White Woman Basin spanning the Colorado-Kansas border north and south of the Arkansas River.


List of major drainage basins

See also

Hydrology
Surface-water hydrology
Stream
State of Colorado
Geography of Colorado
List of rivers in Colorado

Notes

References

External links

State of Colorado website
Colorado Division of Natural Resources
Colorado Water Conservation Board
Colorado Division of Water Resources
Colorado Geological Survey
Major Rivers of Colorado
Colorado's Decision Support Systems
Colorado Watersheds
Colorado Hydrologic Units

Colorado geography-related lists
Geography of Colorado
Lists of landforms of Colorado
Rivers of Colorado
Colorado, List of drainage basins of
Colorado, List of drainage basins of